Malawi sent a delegation to compete at the 1996 Summer Olympics in Atlanta, United States from 19 July to 4 August 1996.  This was the African nation's fifth appearance at a Summer Olympic Games.  The Malawian delegation consisted of two competitors in the sport of athletics; Henry Moyo failed to advance past the first round heats of the 5,000 meters, and John Mwathiwa finished 65th in the marathon.

Background
The Olympic and Commonwealth Games Association of Malawi was recognized by the International Olympic Committee on 1 January 1968.  The nation first joined Olympic competition at the 1972 Summer Olympics, however, they did not compete again until the 1984 Summer Olympics.  Malawi participated in an African boycott over New Zealand's participation at the 1976 Summer Olympics and joined a United States-led boycott of the 1980 Moscow Olympics over the Soviet invasion of Afghanistan.  This made Atlanta Malawi's fifth appearance at a Summer Olympic Games.  The 1996 Summer Olympics were held from 19 July to 4 August 1996; 10,318 athletes represented 194 National Olympic Committees.  The delegation sent by Malawi to Atlanta consisted of two athletics competitors, Henry Moyo and John Mwathiwa.  The Marathon runner, Mwathiwa was selected as the flag-bearer for the opening ceremony.

Athletics
Henry Moyo was 24 years old at the time of the Atlanta Olympics, and was making his only Olympic appearance.  On 31 July, he competed in the heats of the 5,000 meters, where he was drawn into heat two.  He finished the heat in a time of 14 minutes and 30.53 seconds, 13th and last in his heat, and he was eliminated.  The podium was swept by African athletes, with the gold medal eventually won by Vénuste Niyongabo of Burundi, the silver by Paul Bitok of Kenya, and the bronze medal was won by Khalid Boulami of Morocco.

John Mwathiwa was 29 years old at the time of these Olympics, and was making his third consecutive, and final, Olympic appearance.  On 4 August, he took part in the Marathon, a race that was held without rounds or heats.  He finished in 2 hours, 24 minutes, 45 seconds, which put him in 65th place among 111 athletes who finished the race.  The gold medal was won in 2 hours, 12 minutes and 36 seconds by Josia Thugwane of South Africa, the silver by South Korean runner Lee Bong-ju, and the bronze was won by Kenyan Erick Wainaina.

References

Nations at the 1996 Summer Olympics
1996
Oly